Gurab (also Romanized as Gūrāb and Goorab; also known as Gufan and Gurakh) is a village in Howmeh Rural District, in the Central District of Rasht County, Gilan Province, Iran. At the 2006 census, its population was 413, in 116 families.

References 

Populated places in Rasht County